The Jaguar XKSS is a road-going version of the Jaguar D-Type racing car, initially built in 1957. Only 16 were built and sold at the time.  Nine were destroyed in a factory fire in 1957.  In 2016 Jaguar announced that a small production run of nine "continuation" XKSS reproductions would be hand-built to the original specifications to complete the originally scheduled run of 25.

History
Following Jaguar's withdrawal from competition at the end of the 1956 season, a number of completed and partly completed D-types remained unsold at the Browns Lane factory. In an attempt to recoup some of the investment made in building these unused chassis, and to exploit the lucrative American market for high-performance European sports cars, Sir William Lyons decided to convert a number to road-going specification. Only minor changes were made to the basic D-type structure: the addition of a passenger side door; the removal of the large fin behind the driver; and the removal of the divider between passenger and driver seats. In addition, changes were made for cosmetic, comfort and legal reasons: a full-width, chrome-surrounded windscreen was added; sidescreens were added to both driver and passenger doors; a rudimentary, folding, fabric roof was added for weather protection; chromed bumpers were added front and rear (a styling cue later used on the E-type); XK140 rear light clusters were mounted higher on the wings; and thin chrome strips were added to the edges of the front light fairings.

By early 1957 a total of 16 of the planned production run of 25 XKSS's had been completed at Jaguar's Browns Lane plant.  On the evening of 12 February a fire broke out, destroying the remaining nine in mid-production. All of the destroyed vehicles had been destined for North America.  Most of the previously built 16 XKSSs were also sold in the US.

In March 2016, Jaguar announced that it would be completing the original 25 car order  by hand-building the remaining nine XKSS roadsters to the exact original specification, and assigning them the chassis numbers of the destroyed cars. The "continuation" reproductions were expected to sell for more than £1 million each.

Collectors 

The American actor Steve McQueen owned a Jaguar XKSS for personal use, painted British racing green. He referred to the car as the "Green Rat". In 2010 and 2011 it toured the United States as part of the "Allure of the Automobile" exhibit. Steve McQueen's XKSS is currently on display in Los Angeles, California at the Petersen Automotive Museum.

Another XKSS, along with a D-type and C-type, formed the pinnacle of the James Hull collection, a collection of 450 British cars sold for an estimated £100 million in 2014. Other XKSS include XKSS 722 at the Louwman Museum in The Hague.

References

External links
 Road test of The Peterson Museum's XKSS at Jay Leno's Garage

Xkss
Rear-wheel-drive vehicles
Sports cars